Genevieve Nnaji (born on 3 May 1979) is a Nigerian actress, producer, and director. She won the Africa Movie Academy Award for Best Actress in a Leading Role in 2005, making her the first actor to win the award. In 2011, she was honoured as a Member of the Order of the Federal Republic by the Nigerian government for her contributions to Nollywood. Her directorial debut movie, Lionheart, is the first Netflix film from Nigeria and the first Nigerian submission for the Oscars. The movie was disqualified for having most of its dialogue in English. After having spent decades in the movie industry, she was profiled alongside some celebrities and business executives in 2020 in two new books by publisher and Editor in Chief of Yes International! magazine, Azuh Arinze.

Early life 
Genevieve was born in Mbaise, Imo State, Nigeria, and grew up in Lagos. The fourth of eight children, she was raised in a middle-class family; her father worked as an engineer and her mother was a nursery school teacher.

Education 
She attended Methodist Girls College (Yaba, Lagos), before proceeding to the University of Lagos, where she graduated with a bachelor's degree in creative arts. While at the university, she began auditioning for acting jobs in Nollywood.

Career
Nnaji started her acting career as a child actor in the then-popular television soap opera Ripples at the age of 8. In 1998, at the age of 19, she was introduced into the growing Nigerian film industry with the movie Most Wanted. Her subsequent movies include Last Party, Mark of the Beast, and Ijele. In 2010, she starred in the award-winning film Ijé: The Journey. She has starred in over 200 Nollywood movies.

In 2004, Nnaji signed a recording contract with EKB Records; a Ghanaian record label, and released her debut album One Logologo Line. It is a mix of R&B, Hip-Hop, and Urban music. In 2004, Genevieve Nnaji was with the most votes after contending with other celebrities for the search for the face of Lux in 2004.

In 2005, she won the Africa Movie Academy Award (AMAA) for Best Actress in a Leading Role, becoming the first actress
 to win the award.

In 2009, Nnaji was one of the best-paid female actors in Nollywood. Due to her contributions to the Nigerian movie industry, she became the first actor to be awarded Best Actress at the 2001 City People's Awards, the award ceremony that previously had only recognized politicians and business conglomerates. She was also the first actor to be awarded as Best Actress by the Censors Board of Nigeria in 2003. In 2009, she was referred to as the Julia Roberts of Africa by Oprah Winfrey.

In November 2015, Nnaji produced her first movie called Road to Yesterday, later winning Best Movie Overall -West Africa at the 2016 Africa Magic Viewers Choice Awards.

In January 2018, it was reported that Genevieve would be replacing Funke Akindele as a member of the Dora Milaje in Marvel's Avengers: Infinity War. This was later debunked as an internet prank and the actor did not appear in the movie.

On 7 September 2018, her directorial debut Lionheart was acquired by online streaming service Netflix, making it the first Netflix original film from Nigeria. The movie had its world premiere at the 2018 Toronto International Film Festival, alongside Farming, the Adewale Akinnuoye-Agbaje's autobiographical directorial debut where she starred in alongside Kate Beckinsale, Damson Idris, and Gugu Mbatha-Raw.

Genevieve Nnaji is also a women's activist. She advocates for Nigerian girls to be able to have a say in who they choose to marry. She is against early marriages for the girl child. She is strongly against the abuse of women in society. Genevieve says she is a strong advocate for social justice. Further, Genevieve Nnaji is a strong feminist. She states her type of feminism is the woman who has the right to make her own choices and do whatever she feels like.

Modelling

Nnaji has featured in several commercials, including for Pronto (beverage) and Omo detergent. In 2004, she became the "Face of Lux" in Nigeria in a highly lucrative sponsorship deal. In 2008, Nnaji launched the clothing line "St. Genevieve", which donates its proceeds to charity. In May 2010, she was appointed to be the official "Face of MUD" in Nigeria.

Awards and nominations
Nnaji has received several awards and nominations for her work, including the Best Actress of the Year Award at the 2001 City People Awards and the Best Actress in a Leading Role Award at the 2005 Africa Movie Academy Awards.

In 2019, her movie, Lionheart, was selected by the Nigerian Oscars Selection Committee (NOSC), as Nigeria's submission to the Best International Feature Film Category of the 2020 Oscars. It was the first film ever submitted to the Oscars by Nigeria.

Subsequently, the oscar submission was cancelled for not meeting the language criteria. The film's dialogue track is predominantly in the English language. However, the Oscar rules since 2006 dictate that eligible movies must have a "Predominantly non-English dialogue track." This move was an attempt to open up more opportunities for films from diverse cultures.

In a viral tweet on 4 November 2019, the Award-winning filmmaker Ava DuVernay, had questioned the Academy's decision on nixing Lionheart Oscar race for using its official language — English. Nnaji, in response to Ava DuVernay's Tweet, took to Twitter to explain that the country Nigeria as presently constituted, does boast of over 500 languages, making it so ethnically diverse than English, as the official language, can only be the language utilized to make the movie widely acceptable to the eclectic audience across the country, and even beyond the continent of Africa.

In an article published by Culture writer and multiculturalism scholar- Kovie Biakolo titled Nigeria's Lion Heart Disqualification is Bigger than the Oscars on the CNN opinion website; Kovie opined that "one cannot help but feel that Nigeria is ultimately being penalized for being a former British colony in using the very language that was imposed on its people, to communicate between them, and especially for art. Former French, Spanish and Portuguese colonies certainly don't have this problem. And in truth, the Academy may be demonstrating a short-sighted or surface-level understanding of its purported inclusivity in this category".

She went further to criticize the Oscar board for allowing the nominations of British movies that were not done in English, which invariably is the Country's main language but did so in the case of Nigeria whose cultural diversity could be confounding yet true.

92nd Academy Awards (Oscars)

The 19th Black Reel Awards (FAAAF)]
{| class="wikitable"
!Year
!Nominee / work
!Award
!Result
|-
|2019
|Lionheart
|Outstanding Foreign Film / World Cinema Motion Picture'|
|}

Toronto International Film Festival

|-
|2018
|Lionheart
|Grolsch People's Choice Award
|
|-
|}

Africa Movie Academy Awards

|-
|2005
|
|rowspan=3|Best Actress in Leading Role
|
|-
|2008
|30 Days/Keep My Will
|
|-
|2011
|Tango with Me
|
|-
|}

Africa Magic Viewers Choice Awards

|-
|2013
|The Mirror Boy
|rowspan=2|Best Actress Drama/TV Series
|
|-
|rowspan=2|2016
|rowspan=2|Road to Yesterday
|
|-
|Best Movie West Africa
|
|-
|}

Nigeria Entertainment Awards

|-
|2009
|
|Best Actress
|
|-
|rowspan=2|2010
|Silent Scandals
|Best Actress Film/Short Story
|
|-
|Guinness Ultimate Survivor
|Best Actress TV Series
|
|-
|2011
|Tango with Me
|Best Actress Film/Short Story
|
|-
|2013
|Doctor Bello
|Best Actress in Leading Role
|
|-
|2014
|Half of a Yellow Sun
|Best Actress in Supporting Role
|
|-
|rowspan=2|2016
|rowspan=2|Road to Yesterday
|Lead Actress in Film
|
|-
|Best Picture
|
|}

Nollywood Movies Awards

|-
|rowspan=2|2012
|Tango with Me
|Best Actress Leading Role
|
|-
|Herself
|Viewers Choice- Female
|
|-
|}

Ghana Movie Awards

|-
|2010
|Silent Scandals
|Best Actress-Africa Collaboration
|
|-
|}

Golden Icons Academy Movie Awards

|-
|2012
|Herself
|Best Actress- Viewers Choice
|
|-
|}

Nollywood and African Film Critics Awards (NAFCA)

|-
|2013
|Weekend Getaway
|Best Actress Leading Role
|
|-
|}

Zulu African Film Academy Awards

|-
|2011
|The Mirror Boy
|Best Actress
|
|-
|}

City People Entertainment Awards

|-
|2001
|Herself
|Best Actress
|
|-
|}

Best of Nollywood Awards

|-
|2010
|Silent Scandals
|rowspan=2|Best Actress-Leading Role
|
|-
|rowspan=2|2011
|The Mirror Boy
|
|-
|Bursting Out
|Best Kiss with Majid Michel
|
|-
|}

Filmography

Discography
 One Logologo Line'' (2004)

See also
List of Nigerian film producers
 List of Nigerian actresses

References

External links
 
 

1979 births
Living people
University of Lagos alumni
Best Actress Africa Movie Academy Award winners
Igbo actresses
20th-century Nigerian actresses
21st-century Nigerian actresses
21st-century Nigerian women singers
Nigerian rhythm and blues musicians
Actresses from Imo State
Members of the Order of the Federal Republic
People from Mbaise
Methodist Girls' High School alumni
Actresses from Lagos
Nigerian women's rights activists
Nigerian film directors
Nigerian film producers
Nigerian film actresses
Nigerian media personalities
Nigerian television personalities
Nigerian television actresses
Nigerian film award winners